The Brazilian Moto 1000 GP Championship was the main motorcycle category in Brazil between 2011 and 2015.

Competing with Superbike Brasil, the competition was created in 2011 and has been led since its founding by motorcyclist Alexandre Barros. In the category participated: Honda, Suzuki, Kawasaki, Yamaha, BMW and Ducati.

Circuits (2011 - 2015) 
These are the circuits that have hosted a qualifying race for the Brazilian Moto 1000 GP Championship from 2011 to 2015:

  Autódromo Internacional de Curitiba (2011 - 2015)
  Autódromo Internacional de Santa Cruz do Sul (2011 - 2015)
  Autódromo de Interlagos (2011 - 2014)
  Autódromo Internacional Nelson Piquet (2011 - 2012 y 2014)
  Autódromo Internacional Nelson Piquet (2011)
  Autódromo Zilmar Beux de Cascavel (2012 - 2015)
  Autódromo Internacional Orlando Moura (2013 y 2015)
  Autódromo Internacional Ayrton Senna (2014 - 2015)

Brazilian Superbike Champions

GP 1000

GP Light

GP 600

GPR 250

GP Master

BMW S1000RR Cup

GP 1000 EVO

GP 600 EVO

References

External links
 Moto1000gp.com Official website

Moto 1000 GP
2011 establishments in Brazil
Recurring sporting events established in 2011
Superbike racing